The 1872 cricket season was the second in which Derbyshire County Cricket Club played first-class matches. The team was captained by Samuel Richardson. Two matches were arranged against Lancashire County Cricket Club and Derbyshire lost both. Derbyshire also played a match against Prince's Club at their ground in Chelsea, which ended in a draw.

1872 season
Samuel Richardson was captain in his second season. The season saw the arrival of three Wirksworth players Joseph Flint, George Frost and Richard Allsop. Frost and Allsop were both joiners. William Curgenven, a doctor, who had been party to the club's foundation  also made his debut.  George Cammell, Old Etonian of Brookfield Manor made his single appearance for Derbyshire in the match against Prince's Club. The season was the last in which Derbyshire's star bowler Dove Gregory played before his death the following February.

In the first match Lancashire set up a score of 201, and Derbyshire managed 75 in their first innings and 51 in the follow-on. In the match against Queen's Club, Queens opened with 85 and Derbyshire responded with 173. Queens were on 54 for 9 needing 34 to avoid an innings defeat when the two-day match ended in a draw. In this match, Derbyshire player John Burnham played for Prince's Club.  In the second Lancashire match Lancashire set up a score of 137 and Derbyshire responded with 42 and 69 in the follow-on. Lancashire's William McIntyre took 22 Derbyshire wickets in the two matches.   Thomas Attenborough scored most first class runs for Derbyshire, and Dove Gregory took most wickets. Richard Allsop took most catches.

Matches

Statistics

Cricketers who played and their first-class batting performances

First Class bowling performances

Wicket keeping
S Richardson  catches 1, stumping 0

See also
Derbyshire County Cricket Club seasons
1872 English cricket season

References

1872 in English cricket
Derbyshire County Cricket Club seasons
English cricket seasons in the 19th century